Carrera may refer to:

People
 Carrera (surname)

Cars and racing
 Carrera Panamericana, Mexican sports car racing event
 La Carrera Panamericana, a video of the Carrera Panamericana race
 Porsche Carrera, several models of sports cars by the German company Porsche
 Carrera, a German-Austrian slot car brand
 Sally Carrera, a gynomorphic Porsche motorcar, as one of the lead characters in Pixar's film Cars (2006)

Fashion and apparel 
 Carrera Sunglasses, producers of Carrera brand sunglasses and sports eyewear
 Carrera Jeans, Italian clothing brand founded in 1965
 TAG Heuer Carrera, Swiss made watches and chronographs

Music
 "Carrera" (song), 2009 single by Karl Wolf

Places
 General Carrera Lake, lake between Argentina and Chile
 Carrera Island, an island belonging to the Republic of Trinidad and Tobago
 Metro Martín Carrera, station on the Mexico City Metro

Other 
 Advanced Aeromarine Carrera, ultralight aircraft built by Advanced Aeromarine
 Carrera de cintas, traditional sport often played during the feria patronal in Spain and Latin America
 Carrera (cycling team), an Italian bicycle-racing team of the 1980s and 1990s
 Carrera Autopodistica, Italian competition of gravity racing

See also 
 Carrara (disambiguation)